A Snow White Christmas is a pantomime version of the fairytale Snow White, with a book by Kris Lythgoe and a score consisting of a pastiche of well-known pop tunes. It was first produced in 2011 at the El Portal Theatre in North Hollywood, California. The music includes songs by Katy Perry, Bruno Mars, Michael Jackson, The Village People, Britney Spears, Lady Gaga and Hall and Oats, among others. Like other pantomime-style musicals, the show includes magic, dancing, singing, acting, audience interactivity and sing-a-long segments.

Plot 

The story follows the traditional Snow White fairytale with some additional characters. Muddles is the court jester to the Queen and is Snow White's best friend. As in other pantomimes, the 4th wall is broken by the actors, who encourage the audience to cheer for Snow White and boo the Wicked Queen.

Songs

Act 1 
"Born This Way" – Snow White
"The Lazy Song" – The Dwarves
"The Power of Love" – Prince Harry
"Thriller" – Company
"Toxic" – Wicked Queen
"YMCA" – The Dwarves
"Firework" – Snow White
"Just The Way You Are" – Wicked Queen

Act 2 
"You Make My Dreams" – Snow White 
"Celebration" – Company
"Nothings Gonna Change My Love For You" – Prince and Snow White

Productions

El Portal Theatre 2011 
The show was first produced in 2011 at the El Portal Theatre in North Hollywood starring Lindsay Pearce in the title role, Erich Bergen as Prince Harry, and Marina Sirtis as the Wicked Queen. The show featured Neil Patrick Harris as the onscreen Magic Mirror. It received generally positive reviews.

Pasadena Playhouse 2012 
The show was revived in December 2012 by the Pasadena Playhouse and featured Ariana Grande as Snow White, Curt Hansen as Prince Harry and Charlene Tilton as the Wicked Queen. The show once again featured Neil Patrick Harris as the onscreen Magic Mirror and received positive reviews.

Salt Lake City 2013 
In 2013 the show was produced at the Rose Wagner Theatre in Salt Lake City starring David Osmond and Amy Whitcomb. The show featured Nigel Lythgoe as the onscreen Magic Mirror and received good reviews.

Pasadena Civic Auditorium 2019 
In 2019 the show is being produced for a 10-year anniversary production by Lythgoe Family Panto. It features Michelle Williams, Neil Patrick Harris, Garrett Clayton and Jared Gertner. It was first played at the Duke Energy Center in North Carolina. and then moved to the Pasadena Civic Auditorium.

Roles and principal casts

References

Pantomime
Pasadena, California
Plays based on fairy tales
Works based on Snow White